is a business and commercial district south of Shinbashi district in Minato ward in Tokyo, Japan.  Hamamatsucho is located along the Tokyo Bay, with views of Odaiba and the Rainbow Bridge.

Companies based in Hamamatsuchō
 KYB Corporation

History

Places in Hamamatsucho
Hamamatsuchō Station - Served by the JR Yamanote Line, Keihin Tōhoku Line, and the Tokyo Monorail. The latter links Hamamatsuchō with Haneda Airport.
There is a working replica of the Manneken Pis sculpture at Hamamatsuchō Station, which is dressed by station workers in various costumes at different times of year.
Kyū Shiba Rikyū Garden
World Trade Center Building

Transportation

Public transport
 JR East
 Hamamatsuchō
  Yamanote Line
  Keihin–Tōhoku Line
 Tokyo Monorail
 Hamamatsuchō
  Haneda Airport Line
 Toei Subway
 Daimon
  Asakusa Line
  Ōedo Line

Education
Minato City Board of Education operates public elementary and junior high schools.

Hamamatsuchō 1-2-chōme are zoned to Onarimon Elementary School (御成門小学校) and Onarimon Junior High School (御成門中学校).

Gallery

References

Districts of Minato, Tokyo